Stephen P. Webb (born February 23, 1946) is an American politician. He served as the Mayor of Beverly Hills, California from 2006 to 2007.

Biography
He attended the University of Denver and received a B.A. from the California State University at Northridge in 1968. In 1971, he received a J.D. from the University of San Diego.

He is a partner at Tilles, Webb, Kulla & Grant, ALC in Beverly Hills.

References

External links
City of Beverly Hills: Biography of Stephen P. Webb

Living people
Mayors of Beverly Hills, California
1946 births